Boris Claudio "Lalo" Schifrin (born June 21, 1932) is an Argentine-American pianist, composer, arranger, and conductor. He is best known for his large body of film and TV scores since the 1950s, incorporating jazz and Latin American musical elements alongside traditional orchestrations. He is a five-time Grammy Award winner; he has been nominated for six Academy Awards and four Emmy Awards. 

Schifrin's best known compositions include the "Theme from Mission: Impossible", as well as the scores to Cool Hand Luke (1967), Bullitt (1968), THX 1138 (1971), Enter the Dragon (1973), The Four Musketeers (1974), Voyage of the Damned (1976), The Amityville Horror (1979), and the Rush Hour trilogy (1998–2007). Schifrin is also noted for his collaborations with Clint Eastwood from the late 1960s to the 1980s, particularly the Dirty Harry series of films. He composed the Paramount Pictures fanfare used from 1976 to 2004.

In 2019, he received an honorary Oscar "in recognition of his unique musical style, compositional integrity and influential contributions to the art of film scoring."

Early life
Schifrin was born in Buenos Aires to a Jewish family. His father, Luis Schifrin, led the second violin section of the orchestra at the Teatro Colón for three decades. At the age of six, Schifrin began a six-year course of study on piano with Enrique Barenboim, the father of pianist and conductor Daniel Barenboim. Lalo Schifrin shares a familial link to American alpine skier Mikaela Shiffrin. Schifrin began studying piano with the Greek-Russian expatriate Andreas Karalis, former head of the Kyiv Conservatory, and harmony with Argentine composer Juan Carlos Paz. During this time Schifrin also became interested in jazz.

Although Schifrin studied sociology and law at the University of Buenos Aires, it was music that captured his attention. At age 20, he successfully applied for a scholarship to the Conservatoire de Paris. At night, he played jazz in the Paris clubs. In 1955, Schifrin played piano with Argentine bandoneon giant Ástor Piazzolla and represented his country at the International Jazz Festival in Paris.

As jazz composer
After returning home to Argentina in his twenties, Schifrin formed a jazz orchestra, a 16-piece band that became part of a popular weekly variety show on Buenos Aires TV. He also began accepting other film, television and radio assignments. In 1956, he met Dizzy Gillespie and offered to write an extended work for Gillespie's big band. Schifrin completed the work, Gillespiana, in 1958, which was recorded in 1960. Later in 1958, Schifrin began working as an arranger for Xavier Cugat's popular Latin dance orchestra.

While in New York in 1960, Schifrin again met Gillespie, who had by this time disbanded his big band for financial reasons.  Gillespie invited Schifrin to fill the vacant piano chair in his quintet. Schifrin immediately accepted and moved to New York City. Schifrin wrote a second extended composition for Gillespie, The New Continent, which was recorded in 1962.

On 26 May 1963, he recorded an album, Buenos Aires Blues, with Duke Ellington’s alto saxophonist, Johnny Hodges.  Schifrin wrote two compositions for the album; Dreary Blues and the title track B. A. Blues. In the same year Metro-Goldwyn-Mayer, which had Schifrin under contract, offered the composer his first Hollywood film assignment with the African adventure Rhino!. Schifrin moved to Los Angeles and became a U.S. resident in 1963. He became a naturalized U.S. citizen in 1969.

Film scores 
One of Schifrin's most recognizable and enduring compositions is the theme music for the long-running TV series Mission: Impossible. It is a distinctive tune written in the uncommon 5/4 time signature. Similarly Schifrin's theme for the hugely successful Mannix private eye TV show was composed a year later in a 3/4 waltz time; Schifrin composed several other jazzy and bluesy numbers over the years as additional incidental music for the show.

Schifrin's "Tar Sequence" from his Cool Hand Luke score (also written in 6/4) was the longtime theme for the Eyewitness News broadcasts on New York station WABC-TV and other ABC affiliates, as well as Nine News in Australia. CBS Television used part of the theme of his St. Ives soundtrack for its golf broadcasts in the 1970s and early 1980s.

Schifrin's score for the 1968 film Coogan's Bluff was the beginning of a long association with Clint Eastwood and director Don Siegel. Schifrin's strong jazz-blues riffs were evident in Dirty Harry. In 1973 He wrote score for "Enter the Dragon" with funky wah-pedal sound.
  
Schifrin's working score for 1973's The Exorcist was rejected by the film's director, William Friedkin. Schifrin had written six minutes of difficult and heavy music for the initial film trailer, but audiences were reportedly frightened by the combination of sights and sounds. As reported by Schifrin in an interview, Warner Bros. executives told Friedkin to instruct Schifrin to tone it down with softer music, but Friedkin did not relay the message. Schifrin also said that working on the film was one of the most unpleasant experiences in his life. He later reused the compositions in other scores.

In 1976 he released a single called "Jaws", a version of the John Williams theme from the Universal Pictures film Jaws, on CTI (Creed Taylor Incorporated) records. The single spent nine weeks in the UK chart, peaking at number 14. He also composed the 1976 fanfare for Paramount Pictures, which was used mainly for their home video label and was adapted for the television division 11 years later until it was renamed to CBS Paramount Television (now CBS Studios) in 2006.

In 1981, he wrote the music for the 1981 American slapstick comedy film Caveman.

In the 1990s, he wrote many of the arrangements for The Three Tenors concerts.

In the 1998 film Tango, Schifrin returned to tango music, with which he had grown familiar while working as Astor Piazzolla's pianist in the mid-1950s. He brought traditional tango songs to the film, as well as introducing compositions of his own, in which tango is fused with jazz elements.

In 1997, the composer founded Aleph Records.

He also wrote the main theme for Tom Clancy's Splinter Cell: Pandora Tomorrow.

Schifrin made a cameo appearance in Red Dragon (2002) as an orchestra conductor.

He is also widely sampled in hip-hop and trip-hop songs, such as Heltah Skeltah's "Prowl" or Portishead's "Sour Times". Both songs sample Schifrin's "Danube Incident", one of many themes he composed for specific episodes of the Mission: Impossible TV series.

He was commissioned to compose a work titled Symphonic Impressions of Oman.  The Sultan was particularly enthusiastic about the pipe organ.

On April 23, 2007, Lalo Schifrin presented a concert of film music for the Festival du Film Jules Verne Aventures (Festival Jules Verne), at Le Grand Rex theatre in Paris, France – Europe's biggest movie theater. This was recorded by festival leaders for a 73-and-a-half-minute CD named Lalo Schifrin: Le Concert à Paris.

In 2010, a fictionalised account of Lalo Schifrin's creation of the "Theme from Mission: Impossible" tune was featured in a Lipton TV commercial aired in a number of countries around the world.

Seattle-based alternative hip hop group Blue Scholars recorded a track titled "Lalo Schifrin" on their third album Cinemetropolis (2011).

Awards
Lalo Schifrin has won five Grammy Awards (four Grammy Awards and one Latin Grammy), with twenty-two nominations, one CableACE Award, and received six Academy Award and four Primetime Emmy Award nominations. He has a star on the Hollywood Walk of Fame. In 2016, it was announced that his Mission: Impossible theme will be inducted into the Grammy Award Hall of Fame.

The Argentine composer received an honorary Oscar in November 2018, in recognition of his successful career, the Hollywood Academy announced in a press release.

Discography and film scores

See also
 List of music arrangers
 List of jazz arrangers

References

External links
 
 Cinema Retro attends Lalo Schifrin's London concert
 Aleph Records Discography - record label operated by Schifrin
 Two Interviews with Lalo Schifrin, (June 23, 1988, and October 9, 2003)
 Lalo Schifrin Interview for WeirdMusic.net / UKtop40Charts.com Magazine
 
 Lalo Schifrin Interview NAMM Oral History Library (2014)

 
1932 births
20th-century classical composers
20th-century conductors (music)
20th-century jazz composers
21st-century classical composers
21st-century conductors (music)
21st-century jazz composers
Academy Honorary Award recipients
Argentine classical composers
Argentine conductors (music)
Argentine expatriates in the United States
Argentine film score composers
Argentine Jews
Argentine music arrangers
Argentine television composers
Audio Fidelity Records artists
CTI Records artists
Dirty Harry
Dot Records artists
Grammy Award winners
Hispanic and Latino American musicians
Jewish Argentine musicians
Jewish classical composers
Jewish jazz musicians
Latin Grammy Award winners
Latin music composers
Living people
Male classical composers
Male conductors (music)
Male film score composers
Male jazz composers
Male jazz musicians
Male television composers
Naturalized citizens of the United States
Palo Alto Records artists
People from Buenos Aires
Verve Records artists
Varèse Sarabande Records artists